Grand Marais in Seeland is a region in Switzerland, at the foot of the first mountain range of the Jura Mountains contained by the three lakes of Morat (Murten), Neuchâtel and Bienne (Biel). Before the huge hydrological works Jura water correction, it was a marshland that covered . Before the correction the entire Grand Marais, along with the whole of Seeland was prone to very severe recurring floods.

After the Jura water correction, the former marshland has become very valuable agricultural land and made the whole area the most important region in Switzerland for growing vegetables.

The main town and centre of vegetable trading is Müntschemier.

There are two prisons with surrounding agricultural compounds: Bellechasse (Witzwil) and St. Johannsen.

External links 
 
 
 Anstalt Massnahmezentrum St. Johannsen
 ETH-UNS Case Study «Perspektive Grosses Moos – Wege zu einer nachhaltigen Landwirtschaft»

Geography of Switzerland